Akhshunwar (Sogdian: əxšōnδār, Middle Persian: Xašnawāz) was a ruling title used by the Hephthalite kings in the 5th and 6th-centuries.

The title is of Eastern Iranian origin; according W.B. Henning, its original form was ʾxšʾwndʾr (axšōndār), meaning "king", "ruler." G. Widengren, however, suggests that the original form was the Sogdian ʾxšʾwnwʾr, "power bearer." In the New Persian epic Shahnameh ("The Book of Kings") of the medieval Persian poet Ferdowsi, it was transformed into Khushnawaz (meaning "the beautiful player, musician"), and was used as a name instead. Some scholars support the theory that the name of the Kidarite king Kunkhas shared the same origin as Akhshunwar, which has in turn led to the suggestion that Akhshunwar was initially a title used by Kidarites, later to be adopted by Hephthalites when they supplanted them.

References

Sources 
 
 
 

Hephthalites
History of Khorasan
Sogdian words and phrases
Royal titles